Life Without Soul (1915) is a lost horror film, directed by Joseph W. Smiley and written by Jesse J. Goldburg. This film is an adaptation of Mary Shelley's 1818 Gothic novel Frankenstein; or, The Modern Prometheus. The film is about a doctor who creates a soulless man. In the end, it turns out that a young man has dreamed the events of the film after falling asleep reading Shelley's novel.

This version is considered a lost film and the second film version of Frankenstein. The first version was the Edison Manufacturing Company's 12-minute short film Frankenstein (1910), written and directed by J. Searle Dawley.

Production

This full-length film (broken into five parts), was produced by the Ocean Film Corporation and featured English-born actor Percy Darrell Standing wearing little to no make-up as the 'Brute Man'. The story is about the Brute Man killing the sister of his creator (Dr. William Frawley) on her wedding night. Frawley pursues his creation across Europe finally killing him by shooting him. Frawley then dies of exhaustion.
A framing device reveals that the story is being read from a book.
The film was reissued in 1916 by the Raver Film Corporation with added scientific documentary footage detailing the reproduction methods of fish.

Cast 
 Percy Standing as The Creation (aka Brute Man)
 George De Carlton as Frankenstein's Father 
 Lucy Cotton as Elizabeth Lavenza 
 Pauline Curley as Claudia Frawley 
 Jack Hopkins as Henry Claridge
 David McCauley as Victor Frawley, as a child 
 Violet De Biccari as Elizabeth, as a child 
 William A. Cohill as Dr. William Frawley

See also
List of lost films

References

External links

 
 
 

1915 films
American silent feature films
Frankenstein films
1915 horror films
American horror films
Lost horror films
Films based on horror novels
Films set in Manhattan
Films set in 1915
American black-and-white films
Lost American films
1915 lost films
Silent horror films
1910s American films